Touch of Love, A Touch of Love, or The Touch of Love may refer to:

Books
A Touch of Love, by Helen Steiner Rice, 2007
A Touch of Love, by  Hugh Williams, 2000
A Touch of Love, by Jonathan Coe, 1989
A Touch of Love, by Barbara Cartland, 1977
The Touch of Love, by Vanessa Grant, 1990
A Touch of Love, by Phoebe Conn, 1997

Film and television
A Touch of Love (1969 film), a British film directed by Waris Hussein and adapted by Margaret Drabble from her 1965 novel The Millstone
A Touch of Love (1915 film), an American silent short drama film directed by Tom Ricketts starring Vivian Rich, Harry Van Meter, and Charlotte Burton
Nee Paata Madhuram The Touch of Love, Indian film with Roop Kumar Rathod

Music
Touch of Love, album by Kimiko Itoh, 1986
Touch of Love, album by Sergei Georgievich Zakharov
Touch of Love (album), by Twins, 2003
A Touch Of Love, by Yoshiko Goto with Inaba & Nakamure Duo on the label Three Blind Mice, 1975
Just a Touch of Love, fourth album by the American funk band Slave, 1979

Songs
"Sweet Touch of Love", by Allen Toussaint
"A Touch of Love", single by Cleopatra from Comin' Atcha!, 1998
"The Touch of Love", by Kathy Linden, 1957
"Just a Touch of Love" (song), 1991 single written by Robert Clivillés and performed by C+C Music Factory